The 21st Operations Support Squadron (21 OSS) is a United States Space Force unit. Assigned to Space Operations Command's Space Delta 2, it provides operations support to the delta by providing weather information, coordinating the delta's squadron operations, and providing intelligence and administrative support. It is headquartered at Peterson Space Force Base, Colorado.

History

Lineage 
 Constituted as 21st Operations Support Squadron from the consolidation of the 21st Airdrome Squadron and 21st Operations Squadron on 25 September 1991
 Inactivated on 19 December 1991
 Reactivated on 15 May 1992

Assignments 
 21st Operations Group, 15 May 1992 – 24 July 2020
 Space Delta 2, 24 July 2020 – present

List of commanders 

 Lt Col E. McConnell
 Lt Col Troy Endicott, May 2009
 Lt Col Colin Connor, 4 May 2011

See also 
 Space Delta 2

References

External links 

 Fact Sheet
 

Military education and training in the United States
Squadrons of the United States Space Force